Škoro, sometimes transliterated Shkoro or Skoro and spelled Шкоро in Serbian Cyrillic, is a Serbian/Bosnian/Croatian surname.

Notable people with this surname include:
Alen Škoro (born 1981), Bosnian footballer
Jovica Škoro (born 1947), Serbian footballer
Haris Škoro (born 1962), Bosnian footballer
Miroslav Škoro (born 1962), Croatian musician and politician

Bosnian masculine given names
Croatian surnames
Serbian surnames